Neuburgia alata is a species of plant in the Loganiaceae family. It is endemic to Fiji.

References

alata
Endemic flora of Fiji
Near threatened plants
Near threatened biota of Oceania
Taxonomy articles created by Polbot